Nebria davatchii is a species of ground beetle from Nebriinae subfamily that is endemic to Iran.

References

davatchii
Beetles described in 1974
Beetles of Asia
Endemic fauna of Iran